Stachyptilidae is a family of corals belonging to the order Pennatulacea.

Genera:
 Gilibelemnon Lopez Gonzalez & Williams, 2002
 Stachyptilum Kölliker, 1880

References

 
Pennatulacea
Cnidarian families